The Ongilog Lake mine is a large mine located in Mongolia. Ongilog Lake represents one of the largest phosphates reserve in Mongolia having estimated reserves of 1.5 billion tonnes of ore grading 35% P2O5.

References 

Phosphate mines in Mongolia